Redon is a railway station serving the town of Redon, Ille-et-Vilaine department, western France. The station is situated on the Rennes–Redon railway and the Savenay–Landerneau railway.

Services

The station is served by high speed trains to Quimper and Paris, and regional trains to Quimper, Lorient, Vannes, Nantes and Rennes.

References

Railway stations in Ille-et-Vilaine
TER Bretagne
Railway stations in France opened in 1862